Qəbələ Müskürlü (also, Kabalamyuskyurli and Kebele-Myuskyurlyu) is a village in the Goychay Rayon of Azerbaijan.  The village forms part of the municipality of Müskürlü.

References 

Populated places in Goychay District